Botta's gerbil (Dipodillus bottai) is a species of gerbil endemic to Sudan and possibly northern Kenya. According to the International Union for Conservation of Nature, it was listed as Least Concern in 1996 until it was listed as Data Deficient in 2004. According to a 2013 book, it is known from a few specimens taken from four or five localities in a small area between the rivers White Nile and Blue Nile; its habitat is fields of vegetables and cereals. Aside from this information, nothing else is known about the species including its population and threats.

Taxonomy
Botta's gerbil was first described by the French zoologist and herpetologist Fernand Lataste in 1882, he named it Gerbillus bottai. It is known from a small number of locations in Sudan, between the Blue Nile and the White Nile to the south of Khartoum, with some possible sightings in northern Kenya. It may form part of a species complex alongside the Khartoum gerbil (Dipodillus stigmonyx), Harwood's gerbil (Dipodillus harwoodi), and Waters's gerbil (Gerbillus watersi) .

Description
Botta's gerbil is a small species with sandy-brown upper parts with a blackish sheen, especially at the mid-line, and pure white underparts and limbs. The long tail is slightly bi-coloured, with dark hairs above and pale hairs below, the hairs at the tip forming a small tuft or pencil.

References

Musser, G. G. and M. D. Carleton. 2005. Superfamily Muroidea. pp. 894–1531 in Mammal Species of the World a Taxonomic and Geographic Reference. D. E. Wilson and D. M. Reeder eds. Johns Hopkins University Press, Baltimore.

Endemic fauna of Sudan
Dipodillus
Rodents of Africa
Mammals described in 1882
Taxobox binomials not recognized by IUCN